Kurgoqo Atajuq (?–1709/1710) was the Kabardian Supreme Prince between 1695 and 1709 (or 1710).

Biography

Rise to power 
After the death of his uncle Kazıy Misost (1672-1695), he was elected grand prince of Kabarda. He fought a long struggle with the Crimean Khanate.

Struggle against Crimean raids 
In 1699, the Crimean detachment under the command of Kalga Shahbaz-Giray invaded Circassia. In December of the same year, Kalga Shahbaz-Giray was killed in Besleney, in the home of the Kabardian prince Timur-Bulat. In 1700–1701, the Crimean detachments led by Kaplan Giray I attacked Circassia and Kabarda twice. In 1703, the army of the Crimeans and their allies under the leadership of Kalga Gazi Giray occupied Kabarda. Tatars and Nogais engaged in robbery and extortion against Circassians. A general uprising broke out in Kabarda. In 1707, the Crimean Tatars launched a new raid on Kabarda. The Tatars took thousands of cattle, but were defeated by the Kabardians.

During the reign of Kurgoko Atajuq, the famous Battle of Kanzhal (1708) took place, in which the Kabardians defeated a large Tatar-Turkish army led by Qaplan I Giray. This event was of great importance in the history of Circassia and the entire history of the North Caucasus. Many episodes of the Kanzhal battle have been preserved in Adyghe folklore in the form of legends and historical-epic songs in which Kurgoqo Atajuq is the main character. The Kabardians under his command defended their homeland and preserved their political independence. The war increased Kabardian authority in the Caucasus.

In 1710, the Crimean Tatars and Nogais launched a new raid on Circassia and Kabarda, capturing large numbers of cattle and horses.

Death 
Grand Prince Kurgoqo Atajuq died in 1709 (or early 1710).

References 

1709 deaths
Circassian nobility
17th-century births
Year of birth missing